Clarence Emmett "Mark" Marquess (March 26, 1925 — January 19, 2015) was a Canadian professional ice hockey player who played 27 games in the National Hockey League with the Boston Bruins during the 1946–47 season in which he recorded five goals and four assists for a total of nine NHL points.  His first goal came in a home game versus the Chicago Back Hawks on January 15, 1947.  Marquess, in fact, scored two goals in that contest--one of which was the game-winning tally.  Boston won the game, 6-3.  Marquess appeared in four Boston playoff games in the spring of 1947 but failed to record a point.

The rest of his career, which lasted from 1945 to 1958, was spent in various minor leagues. He died in 2015, aged 89 at his home in East Wenatchee, Washington.

Career statistics

Regular season and playoffs

References

External links

1925 births
2015 deaths
Boston Bruins players
Boston Olympics players
Canadian ice hockey right wingers
Ice hockey people from Alberta
Hershey Bears players
Moose Jaw Canucks players
People from the County of Newell
People from East Wenatchee, Washington
Seattle Bombers players
Tacoma Rockets (WHL) players
Vancouver Canucks (WHL) players
Victoria Cougars (1949–1961) players